The 2014 British Athletics Championships was the national championship in outdoor track and field for athletes in the United Kingdom, held 27–29 June 2014 at Alexander Stadium in Birmingham. It was organised by UK Athletics. It served as a selection meeting for the 2014 European Athletics Championships.

Medal summary

Men

Women

References

External links
British Athletics website

British Outdoor Championships
British Athletics Championships
Athletics Outdoor
British Athletics Championships
Sports competitions in Birmingham, West Midlands
2010s in Birmingham, West Midlands